Human is an Indian 2022 medical thriller streaming television series released on 14 January 2022 on Disney+ Hotstar, which portrays  the underbelly of human drug testing and the world of medical scams and aims to expose the nexus between pharmaceutical companies, large private hospitals, and government officials who exploit the poor in human trials for new drugs.

Cast 

 Shefali Shah as  Dr. Gauri Nath
 Kirti Kulhari as Dr. Saira Sabharwal
 Vishal Jethwa as Mangu
 Riddhi Kumar as Deepali
 Indraneil Sengupta as Neil
 Shruti Bapna as Sucheta Shekhawat
 Seema Biswas as Roma
 Aditya Srivastav as Ashok Vaidya
 Aasif Khan as Omar Pervez
 Atul Kumar as Dr. Snehal Shindey
 Ram Kapoor as Pratap Munjal
 Rahul Tiwari Adhiyari as Balram
 Mohan Agashe as Mohan Vaidya
 Sandeep Kulkarni as Pramod Ahuja
 Ansha Sayed as Shalini
 Siddhanth Karnick as Ravish
 Pranali Ghogare as Meena
 Rishi Deshpande as Dr. Akash Swarup
 Purnima Rathod as Sulochana Nath
 Jagat Rawat as Saira's Father
 Shabnam Vadhera as Saira's Mother
 Abhijit Lahiri as Nathu Lal
 Govind Pandey as Chandrakant Shankar
 Gaurav Dwivedi as  Dr. Vivek Shekhawat
 Sushil Pandey as Mangu's Father
 Shadab Siddiqui as Dr. Deepak
 Rama Krishna Dixit as Raghav Chandra
 Mark Bennington as Dr. Ross
 Hansa Singh as Dr. Gul Goyal

References

External links

Indian drama television series
Indian crime television series
Hindi-language Disney+ Hotstar original programming